Frederic Adolphus "Ojay" Larson, Jr. (October 15, 1897 – May 1, 1977) was an American football center in the National Football League for six seasons for the Chicago Bears, the Milwaukee Badgers, the Green Bay Packers and the Chicago Cardinals.

References

1897 births
1977 deaths
People from Calumet, Michigan
Players of American football from Michigan
American football centers
Notre Dame Fighting Irish football players
Chicago Bears players
Milwaukee Badgers players
Green Bay Packers players
Chicago Cardinals players